Ghanim Bin Saad Al Saad  ( born 23 August 1964 in Doha, Qatar) is a Qatari businessperson and the Chairman of GSSG Holding.

Education
According to Al Saad, he has a BA in Social Sciences from Qatar University, as well as a master's degree in Social Policy & Administration from Kent University in the UK and a PhD from Greenwich University, London.

Career 

Al Saad's early career included the position of Director at the Ministry of Cabinet Affairs in 1998, after working at the Ministry of Justice and the Supreme Council for Planning in Qatar.  He has held the position of Ambassador for Qatar's Ministry of Foreign Affairs from 1998 to the present day. He has been an adviser to the Prime Minister of Qatar, Sheikh Hamad Bin Jassim Al-Thani, on business investments for Qatar's Sovereign Fund.

He founded The Jersey Group in 1994, which is now known as the Ghanim Bin Saad Al Saad & Sons Holdings (GSSG) Group and which was incorporated it in 2007. GSSG's subsidiaries include Rizon Jet, the first private jet operator in the Middle East.

Al Saad joined the General Assembly of Qatar Charity in 2001. He became a board member in 2001. He was appointed as chairman of the charity on 13 October 2010 and he remains the current chairman.

He held the position of Chairman and Managing Director of Barwa Real Estate Company (January 2006 – April 2011).  Barwa Real estate is a semi-governmental real estate company 45% owned by Qatari Diar and 55% listed on the Doha Stock Exchange.

Al Saad was a board member, CEO and managing director of Qatari Diar Real Estate Company from 2008 to 2011. Qatari Diar is the wholly owned real estate arm of the Qatar Investment Authority and the Government of Qatar. He is currently the company's chief executive officer.

He was chairman of the Qatar Railways Company for 2010–2011.

Al Saad was a member of the Qatar-Bahrain Causeway Committee.

“Renewing the Arab World” in Paris, January 2015 
Ghanem was a featured speaker at the “Renewing the Arab World” conference at the Arab Institute in Paris, January 2015 along with President of France François Hollande, French Foreign Minister Laurent Fabius, Jacques Lang, President of the Arab World Institute and many other international leaders dedicated to building stronger relationships among all religions.

Awards and recognition
TAKREEM Award for Outstanding Corporate Leader (2011)
65th Rank in the Arabian Business' list "The world’s 100 most influential Arabs, 2009"
50th on Arabian Business' "Qatar Power List 2015" 
Al Saad ranks number 12 on the CEO Middle East Property Power List. He was featured at number 27 on the Arabian Business Qatar Power List of 2012. Al Saad has also received the title of ‘Datuk’, the Malaysian equivalent of a British peerage, from the King of Malaysia.

References

External links 
 GSSG Holding
 Rizonjet
 Ghanim Bin Saad Al-Saad: "Enriching your world"
 Ghanim Bin Saad to Al Rai: Qatari Interest to invest in Kuwait’s development plan
 The Awards Ceremony of 2011

1964 births
Living people
Qatari businesspeople
Qatar University alumni
Alumni of the University of Kent
Ambassadors of Qatar